The Barisan Revolusi Nasional Melayu Patani, also known by the shorter form Barisan Revolusi Nasional (BRN; English: Patani Malays (or Malayu) National Revolutionary Front)), meaning "National Revolutionary Front", is an Islamist Patani independence movement in northern Malaysia (Perlis, Kedah and Kelantan) and Patani, southern Thailand. As of 2017, it is the most powerful rebel group in the region.

Originally the BRN was established as a roughly territorial organisation, prioritizing Pattani secessionism. Since 2001, however, the BRN-C (BRN-Coordinasi) has become its most active wing, leading the south Thailand insurgency and imposing extreme religious values on the local society.

The BRN-C, through its "Pejuang Kemerdekaan Patani" paramilitary wing, is the main group behind the murder of teachers in the Southern Border Provinces.

History
The BRN was founded on 13 March 1963 by Haji Abdul Karim Hassan. By 1984, three main factions were discernible within the group:

BRN-Koordinasi
The BRN-Coordinate or BRN-C (BRN-Koordinasi) is currently the largest, most active and best organised of the BRN subgroups. Rejecting the Pan-Arab socialist thought that influenced the early BRN, it favours Salafist ideology and is involved in political activism in the mosques and indoctrination at Islamic schools. The main recruiting unit of the BRN-C is the Pemuda (youth) student group and its leaders are mainly Islamic religious teachers, including veterans of the Soviet–Afghan War.

The BRN-Koordinasi is acknowledged as the group currently spearheading the insurgency in southern Thailand and is at the origin of the group known as Runda Kumpulan Kecil (RKK) to which most violent attacks have been attributed in the last decade.

The BRN-C sees no reason for negotiations and is against talks with other insurgent groups. The BRN-C has the vision of becoming a mass-organisation. It has as its immediate aim to make southern Thailand ungovernable, having largely been successful at it.

Structure
The Pejuang Kemerdekaan Patani (Patani Independence Fighters) are the paramilitary wing of the BRN-C. These militant units operate in the rural areas of southern Thailand working along with the BRN-Coordinate leadership in a loosely organised strictly clandestine cell system dependent on hard-line religious leaders for direction. They are also behind the attacks on schoolteachers.

Other groups
 BRN-Congress or BRN-K (BRN-Kongres), led by Rosa Burako, has been pursuing a military struggle but is currently less active.
 BRN-Ulama. There is little information about this subgroup.

The group's violent separatist insurgency began in 2004, with tactics such as setting two bombs at one location, with the second designed to kill and injure those attending the aftermath of the first. In total, the southern insurgency has killed more than 6,000 people.

Peace talks
In January 2020, the Thai Peace Dialogue Panel, led by General Wanlop Rugsanaoh, met with BRN representative Anas Abdulrahman in Kuala Lumpur, in what was described as "the first round of official peace dialogue" by BRN official Abdul Aziz Jabal. The two sides reportedly agreed on a framework for further negotiations.

Incidents 

In the past decade, the BRN-C has been involved in numerous arson, bombing, and murder attacks to create an atmosphere of fear and uncertainty in the three southern provinces of Thailand. Thai military observers believe that the attacks are mostly carried out by its loosely affiliated and clandestine RKK outfit.

On 1 May 2013, insurgents attacked a restaurant in the Pattani Region. The perpetrators, armed with machine guns, killed six people including a two-year-old child. The act was an act of revenge, that appeared twelve hours following the action in the three predominantly Muslim provinces of Narathiwat, Pattani and Yala.

Use of children 
In 2013 and 2014, the UN received reports that the BRN and other armed groups had recruited boys and girls from the age of 14; children were given military training and assigned as combatants, informants and scouts. No such reports were recorded by the UN in 2015 or 2016.

See also
 Islamism
 Salafi jihadism
 South Thailand insurgency

Notes

References

South Thailand insurgency
Rebel groups in Thailand
Islamist groups
Jihadist groups

ca:Barisan Revolusi Nasional Melayu Patani